Waldir Villas Boas (3 June 1925 – 17 October 2004) was a Brazilian footballer who competed in the 1952 Summer Olympics. He died on 17 October 2004, at the age of 79.

References

1925 births
2004 deaths
Association football defenders
Brazilian footballers
Olympic footballers of Brazil
Footballers at the 1952 Summer Olympics
Bonsucesso Futebol Clube players